is the ninth album by Yui Horie.  It was released on January 7, 2015, as a standard edition and two First Press limited editions, that came in a Red or Blue variation.

Album covers and insert photo booklets were shot in England, with the location having been decided before music production had even began.  The focus of the shoot was heritage buildings and castles.  As a result of this decision, Gothic, Classic and Mysterious elements were purposely included within the musical composition.  This was in addition to the "strange mood" musical stylings of previous collaborator Ryujin Kiyoshi, which was seen as complementary to their intended art direction.

The album achieved a peak position of fifth in the Oricon Charts, staying in the chart for seven weeks.

Track listing
プロローグ ～edge of the unknown～ (Prologue -Edge of the Unknown-)
 Lyrics: Yamazaki Hiroko. Composition & Arrangement: Okawa Shigenobu
The♥World’s♥End 
 Lyrics, Composition & Arrangement: Ryujin Kiyoshi
 2nd opening theme song for Golden Time
Stand Up!
 Lyrics: Masumi Asano. Composition & Arrangement: Okawa Shigenobu
 Theme song for the game White Cat Project (iOS & Android)
Happy End 
 Lyrics: Kawada Ruka. Composition & Arrangement: Tak Miyazawa 
Sweet & Sweet CHERRY
 Lyrics: YUKACO. Composition & Arrangement: Kohei by SIMONSAYZ. String Arrangement: Hasegawa Tomoki 
 Ending theme song for Golden Time
ミステリー... (Mystery...)
 Lyrics, Composition & Arrangement: Ryujin Kiyoshi
半永久的に愛してよ♥ (Haneikyuu Teki ni Aishite yo)
 Lyrics, Composition & Arrangement: Ryujin Kiyoshi
 2nd ending theme song for Golden Time
ほんのちょっと (Honno Chotto)
 Lyrics, Composition & Arrangement: Kawada Ruka 
Golden Time
 Lyrics: Yoshida Shiori. Composition & Arrangement: Kohei by SIMONSAYZ
 Opening theme song for Golden Time
Let it Go
 Theme song for Frozen character Elsa
この場所で (Kono Basho De)
 Lyrics: Yoshida Shiori. Composition: SHIKI. Arrangement: Okawa Shigenobu 
 Theme of the OVA 
Innocent Note
 Lyrics & Composition: Miyazaki Mayu.Arrangement: Hisashi Asano
Girl Friend
 Lyrics, Composition & Arrangement: Ryujin Kiyoshi
Garden 
 Lyrics, Composition & Arrangement: Yamazaki Hiroko

References

Yui Horie albums
2015 albums